Carlos González Cabrera (12 April 1935 – 8 July 2017) was a Mexican football league forward.

Career
He played for Mexico in the 1958 FIFA World Cup. He also played for Club Atlas.

References

External links
FIFA profile

1935 births
Mexico international footballers
Association football forwards
Atlas F.C. footballers
1958 FIFA World Cup players
Footballers from Mexico City
Living people
Mexican footballers